Moftin is a commune of 4,328 inhabitants situated in Satu Mare County, Romania. Its center is Moftinu Mic, and the commune is composed of seven villages:

It borders the city of Carei and Căpleni commune to the west, Căuaș commune to the south, Terebești and Craidorolț communes to the east and Doba commune to the north.

History 
On 1 May 1711, at the end of Rákóczi's War of Independence, 12,000 rebels laid down their arms and took an oath of allegiance to the Emperor in the fields outside Kismajtény (Moftinu Mic).

Demographics
Ethnic groups (2002 census):
Romanians: 57.39%
Hungarians: 31.81%
Roma: 4.78%

According to mother tongue, 53.65% speak Romanian as their first language, while 44.59% of the population speak Hungarian:

Natives
 Silviu Lung

References

Communes in Satu Mare County